Virtual Soccer – known in Japan as   – is a 1994 football video game published by Hudson Soft.

Summary
The Japanese version featured all clubs from the top division of Japan Professional Football League J.League Division 1 (1994 J.League season), while the European version featured national teams. The player can choose two views, from a left-right perspective or with top-down perspective. There are many other options such as wind control, weather, environment, pitch type and player's velocity.

See also
 J.League Super Soccer '95 Jikkyō Stadium
 List of J.League licensed video games

References

1994 video games
Hudson Soft games
Association football video games
J.League licensed video games
Super Nintendo Entertainment System games
Super Nintendo Entertainment System-only games
Video games developed in the United Kingdom
Video games set in 1994
Video games set in Japan
Multiplayer and single-player video games